Cynometra filifera is a species of plant in the family Fabaceae. It is found only in Tanzania.

Taxonomy

References

filifera
Endemic flora of Tanzania
Taxonomy articles created by Polbot
Endangered flora of Africa